Brian Johnson (born March 5, 1999) is an American football placekicker who is currently a free agent. He played college football at Virginia Tech and signed with the Chicago Bears as an undrafted free agent in 2021. Johnson has also been a member of the New Orleans Saints and Washington Football Team.

College career
Johnson was a member of the Virginia Tech Hokies for five seasons, redshirting as a true freshman. He finished his collegiate career with 54 field goals on 71 attempts (76.1%) and all 131 of extra points he attempted.

Professional career

Chicago Bears
Johnson was signed by the Chicago Bears as an undrafted free agent on May 13, 2021. He was waived on August 31, 2021, during final roster cuts and re-signed to the team's practice squad the following day.

New Orleans Saints
Johnson was signed by the New Orleans Saints off the Bears' practice squad on October 12, 2021. He made his professional debut on October 25, 2021, against the Seattle Seahawks on Monday Night Football and made a field goal with 1:56 left in the fourth quarter to put the Saints ahead in a 13-10 win. He was waived on November 19, 2021.

Chicago Bears (second stint)
On November 23, 2021, Johnson signed with the Chicago Bears’ practice squad.

Washington Football Team / Commanders
Johnson signed with the Washington Football Team on November 30, 2021, after former Virginia Tech teammate, Joey Slye, was placed on injured reserve. In his first game with the team, Johnson made a game-winning 48-yard field goal in a 17-15 victory over the Las Vegas Raiders. Johnson played in 3 games before Slye returned and resumed duties as the starting kicker. The team placed an exclusive-rights free agent tender on him on March 16, 2022, which went unsigned before he was released on June 13, 2022.

References

External links
 Virginia Tech Hokies bio

1999 births
Living people
Players of American football from Washington, D.C.
American football placekickers
Virginia Tech Hokies football players
Chicago Bears players
New Orleans Saints players
Washington Football Team players